Qardaha District is a district of the Latakia Governorate in northwestern Syria. Administrative centre is the city of Qardaha. At the 2004 census, the district had a population of 75,279.

Sub-districts
The district of Qardaha is divided into four sub-districts or nawāḥī (population as of 2004):
Qardaha Subdistrict (ناحية القرداحة): population 44,510.
Harf al-Musaytirah Subdistrict (ناحية حرف المسيترة): population 6,669.
Al-Fakhurah Subdistrict (ناحية الفاخورة): population 18,357.
Jawbat Burghal Subdistrict (ناحية جوبة برغال): population 5,743.

References